Kv channel-interacting protein 2 also known as KChIP2 is a protein that in humans is encoded by the KCNIP2 gene.

Function 

This gene encodes a member of the family of voltage-gated potassium (Kv) channel-interacting proteins (KCNIPs, also frequently called "KChIP"), which belong to the recoverin branch of the EF-hand superfamily. Members of the KCNIP family are small calcium binding proteins. They all have EF-hand-like domains, and differ from each other in the N-terminus. They are integral subunit components of native Kv4 channel complexes. They may regulate A-type currents, and hence neuronal excitability, in response to changes in intracellular calcium. Alternative splicing results in multiple transcript variant encoding different isoforms.

See also 
 Voltage-gated potassium channel

References

Further reading

External links 
 

EF-hand-containing proteins